Expressway S14 or express road S14 is a short expressway in Poland which, when completed, will serve as the western bypass of Łódź. The total length is planned to be .

Construction of the first 9.6 km section forming the bypass of Pabianice began in 2010. It opened in two stages, in May 2012 and July 2012. Another 4.1 km extension to the south connects it to the S8 expressway. This extension opened to traffic in April 2014. The tender for building the remaining 27 km was opened on 2 October 2015, with completion expected around 2019. However, it was cancelled and reopened in 2017. Contracts were signed in 2019, and the expected completion date is set in early 2023 for the northern section.

Route description

References 

Expressways in Poland
Proposed roads in Poland